Raymond Willis may refer to:
Raymond E. Willis (1875–1956), United States Senator from Indiana
Richard Raymond Willis (1876–1966), English recipient of the Victoria Cross
Ray Willis (born 1982), American football player
Ray Willis (basketball) (born 1989), American basketball player